The finals in the women's 3000 metre relay in short track speed skating at the 2010 Winter Olympics took place on 24 February, at the Pacific Coliseum. In the final, the event was controversially won by the Chinese team, which set a new world record. The South Korean team initially finished first but was disqualified due to illegal contact which was deemed to have impeded a Chinese skater.

Results

Semifinals

Finals

Final B (Classification Round)

Final A (Medal Round)

References

External links
 2010 Winter Olympics results: Ladies' 3000 m Relay Semifinals, from http://www.vancouver2010.com/; retrieved 2010-02-13.
 2010 Winter Olympics results: Ladies' 3000 m Relay Finals, from http://www.vancouver2010.com/; retrieved 2010-02-13.

Women's short track speed skating at the 2010 Winter Olympics